Spirobranchus giganteus, commonly known as the Christmas tree worm, is a tube-building polychaete worm belonging to the family Serpulidae.

Anatomy and morphology

Both its common and Latin names refer to the two chromatically hued spiral structures, the most common feature seen by divers. The multicolored spirals are highly derived structures for feeding and respiration.

Spirobranchus giganteus is similar to most tube-building polychaetes. It has a tubular, segmented body of an approximate length of 3.8 cm (1.5 in) covered with chaetae, small appendages that aid the worm's mobility. Because it does not move outside its tube, this worm does not have any specialized appendages for movement or swimming.

The worms' most distinct features are two "crowns" shaped like Christmas trees. These are highly modified prostomial palps, which are specialized mouth appendages. Each spiral is composed of feather-like tentacles called radioles, which are heavily ciliated and cause any prey trapped in them to be transported to the worm's mouth. While they are primarily feeding structures, S. giganteus also uses its radioles for respiration; hence, the structures commonly are called "gills".

One major difference between Christmas tree worms and other Sabellida fan worms is that the latter do not have any specialized body structures to plug their tube holes when they withdraw into them. S. giganteus, like other members of its family, possesses a modified radiole, usually called the operculum, that it uses to secure its hole when withdrawn into its tube.

As an annelid, S. giganteus possesses a complete digestive system and has a well-developed closed circulatory system. Like other annelids, these worms possess well-developed nervous systems with a central brain and many supporting ganglia, including pedal ganglia, unique to the Polychaeta. . Like other polychaetes, S. giganteus excretes with fully developed nephridia. When they reproduce, they simply shed their gametes straight into the water where the eggs and spermatozoa become part of the zooplankton to be carried by the currents.

Range and distribution
Christmas tree worms are widely distributed throughout the world's tropical oceans. They have been known to occur from the Caribbean to the Indo-Pacific.

Ecology
S. giganteus is commonly found embedded entirely in heads of massive corals, such as stony corals Porites and brain corals. Like members of its family, it can secrete a calcareous tube around its body. This tube serves as the worm's home and protection. S. giganteus usually settles onto an existing head of living coral before secreting its tube, thereby increasing its level of protection as coral tissue overgrows the calcareous tube. When the worm retreats into its tube, the opening is shut using an operculum, which is further protected by  sharp, antler-shaped spines.

As sedentary inhabitants of coral reefs, Christmas tree worms feed primarily by filter feeding. They use their brightly colored radioles to filter microorganisms from the water, which are then deposited straight into the worm's digestive tract.

Few organisms are known to feed on tube-borne polychaetes and S. giganteus is no exception. The symbiotic relationship between S. giganteus and its host corals is still poorly understood, but occasionally the movement of the operculum can abrade the coral tissue, and that mortality of the coral tissue is enhanced when the worm's operculum hosts filamentous algae.

Importance to humans
While the worm itself has no commercial fishery importance, it is of interest to marine aquarists and divers. The variously colored worm crowns make extremely popular underwater photographic subjects for sport divers. Many aquarists who have miniature reef aquaria purposely include heads of coral that S. giganteus specimens inhabit.

Conservation status
As the species is widespread and relatively common,  no conservation efforts focus on this species (or polychaetes in general). This species was thought to be exclusively found in coralheads, however they have also recently been described as epibionts on the giant clam species Tridacna squamosa in the Gulf of Thailand. The conservation status of the host species which it inhabits varies.

Etymology and taxonomy
Spirobranchus essentially translates to "spiral gills", referring to the worm's unique crown. Two subspecies are recognized by the ITIS: S. giganteus corniculatus and S. giganteusa giganteus.

References

Further reading

Gallery

External links
 

Fauna of the Philippines
Serpulidae
Animals described in 1766
Fauna of the Caribbean
Fauna of the Dominican Republic
Invertebrates of the Indian Ocean
Fauna of the Pacific Ocean
Taxa named by Peter Simon Pallas